Two referendums were held in Liechtenstein on 22 September 1991. Voters were asked whether they approved of amendments to a law on noise protection, as well as introducing a five-day week at schools. Both proposals were rejected.

Results

Noise protection law

Five day week for schools

References

1991 referendums
1991 in Liechtenstein
1991
September 1991 events in Europe